In taxonomy, an undescribed taxon is a taxon (for example, a species) that has been discovered, but not yet formally described and named. The various Nomenclature Codes specify the requirements for a new taxon to be validly described and named. Until such a description has been published, the taxon has no formal or official name, although a temporary, informal name is often used. A published scientific name may not fulfil the requirements of the Codes for various reasons. For example, if the taxon was not adequately described, its name is called a nomen nudum. It is possible for a taxon to be "undescribed" for an extensive period of time, even if unofficial descriptions are published.

An undescribed species may be referred to with the genus name, followed by "sp"., but this abbreviation is also used to label specimens or images that are too incomplete to be identified at the species level. In some cases, there is more than one undescribed species in a genus. In this case, these are often referred to by a number or letter. In the shark genus Pristiophorus, for example, there were, for some time, four undescribed species, informally named Pristiophorus sp. A, B, C and D. (In 2008, sp. A was described as Pristiophorus peroniensis and sp. B as P. delicatus.) When a formal description for species C or D is published, its temporary name will be replaced with a proper binomial name.

Provisional names in bacteriology
In bacteriology, a valid publication of a name requires the deposition of the bacteria in a Bacteriology Culture Collection. Species for which this is impossible cannot receive a valid binomial name; these species are classified as Candidatus.

Provisional names in botany
A provisional name for a species may consist of the number or of some other designation of a specimen in a herbarium or other collection. It may also consist of the genus name followed by such a specimen identifier or by a provisional specific epithet which is enclosed by quotation marks. In the latter case, the author citation may be replaced by the Latin term ineditus or ined., meaning "unpublished". As of 2013, many species of the flowering plant genus Polyscias can be found in the scientific literature under such a designation. An enquoted name, however, is not necessarily unpublished. It may be an illegitimate name that has not yet been replaced by a correct name. For example, the name "Endressia" (sensu Whiffin) was published in 2007 for a genus in family Monimiaceae, but is an illegitimate homonym of Endressia J.Gay in family Apiaceae. In 2010, it was noted as illegitimate, but still used with quotation marks. This name was replaced with Pendressia in 2018.

See also
 Glossary of scientific naming
 Candidatus, an interim taxonomic status for yet-to-be-cultured organisms
 Species description
 Nomenclature codes

References

External links 
 Polyscias (Search Exact) At: Names At: Tropicos At: Science and Conservation At: Missouri Botanical Garden
 Endressia  Plant Names  IPNI

 
Biological descriptions